Nicolás Antonio Valerio (born 18 August 1992) is an Argentine professional footballer who plays as a midfielder for Santamarina.

Career
Valerio's career began with Santamarina. He made his senior bow on 21 November 2012 during a Copa Argentina match with Grupo Universitario, prior to scoring on his league debut in the following February against Rivadavia in Torneo Argentino A. Further goals against San Jorge and Talleres followed in the 2012–13 campaign. Valerio featured twice in the following season, which concluded with promotion to Primera B Nacional as champions. He netted his first goal in the second tier on 13 April 2015 during a 1–0 victory over Instituto.

Personal life
Valerio is the brother of fellow footballer Rodolfo Valerio.

Career statistics
.

Honours
Santamarina
Torneo Argentino A: 2013–14

References

External links

1992 births
Living people
People from Tandil
Argentine footballers
Association football midfielders
Torneo Argentino A players
Primera Nacional players
Club y Biblioteca Ramón Santamarina footballers
Sportspeople from Buenos Aires Province